The Albany Bulb (also simply known as The Bulb) is a former landfill largely owned by the City of Albany, in California. The Bulb is the west end of a landfill peninsula jutting west from the east shore of San Francisco Bay. The term "Bulb" is often used to refer to the entire peninsula, which includes the Albany Plateau, north of Buchanan Street at its base; the high narrow "Neck," and the round "Bulb." The Bulb is part of the City of Albany, and can be reached via Buchanan Street or the Bay Trail along the east side of San Francisco Bay.

History 

Like the Point Isabel peninsula to the north and the Berkeley Marina, Point Emery, and Emeryville Marina Peninsulas to the south, the Bulb peninsula is a relic of almost a century of systematic filling of the shallow Bay and its adjacent wetland. This filling was largely halted by efforts of Save The Bay from the 1960s to the 1980s. The usual fill method can be seen in the rectangular lagoon at the west end of the Bulb peninsula, a remnant left when legal action finally forced closure of the dump: Enclose part of the shallow Bay with rock and concrete rip-rap, fill the created lagoon with garbage and debris, and (usually) top off with a layer of clay. The development dream was to join the peninsulas, leaving a narrow shipping channel edged by commerce.

The tidelands off Berkeley and Albany were sold by the state in the 1870s, as railroads extended tracks northward along the waterfront from the Oakland terminus of the Transcontinental Railroad. (These tracks soon became the main transcontinental line.) Early in the 20th century, the tidelands were acquired by the rival Santa Fe Railroad.

Creation of the Bulb peninsula can be said to have begun in 1939, when the Santa Fe Railroad dynamited El Cerrito del Sur, the low hill on Fleming Point southwest of Albany Hill, to build Golden Gate Fields race track. The debris was pushed into the Bay to create parking lots. Almost immediately afterward, the City of Albany extended Buchanan Street west on Bay fill, creating a lagoon between Buchanan and the north edge of the race track. Aerial photos show the gradual filling of this lagoon at the same time that dumping extended the peninsula west into the Bay and, later, north onto the Plateau. The small salt marsh south of Buchanan, fed by Codornices and Village Creeks, grew in the last remnants of the lagoon, an echo of much larger wetlands that once flourished farther south, where the creek waters emptied into the Bay behind (east of) the dynamited hill.

The Bulb proper—the round hill at the tip of the peninsula—was created in 1963, after the City of Albany and Santa Fe, which owned the land, signed a contract for the disposal of construction debris. Thus The Bulb is made of mostly of construction debris such as concrete and rebar, as is still very visible. Lawsuits against the landfill operator brought the dumping to a halt in 1983.

The City of Albany entertained a variety of proposals for development of the peninsula, including high-rise hotels and a marina. In 2002, however, 17 years of effort by Citizens for Eastshore State Park (now Citizens for Eastshore Parks) resulted in the Plateau and lower Neck, along with shoreline to the north and south, becoming part of The Eastshore State Park. The City of Albany maintains ownership of The Bulb itself. The City of Albany continues to negotiate to have the State Parks Department (owners of the park) and/or East Bay Regional Park District (managers of the park and owners of some adjacent shoreline) take over the Bulb. Other entities are reluctant due to liability and potential costs of making the area, with its projecting concrete and rebar, "safe." Meanwhile, the Bulb area and adjacent Albany Beach have become one of the most heavily used outdoor recreation sites in the Bay.

Natural conditions and ecology 

Bay currents were altered by creation of the Bulb and fill peninsulas to the north and south (Pt. Isabel was natural, but its hill was dynamited in the 1950s and marshes between it and the mainland were filled). One result has been westward extension of tidal mudflats at the mouths of Codornices, Village, and Marin Creeks, between the Bulb peninsula and Pt. Isabel. These are the Albany Mudflats, protected as important habitat for waterfowl and shorebirds. The wooden posts in the area often serve as perches for Peregrine Falcons and ospreys eating their catches.

Another result was the formation of Albany Beach—low dunes and a sandy beach running south between the Bulb peninsula and Fleming Point. Sandy beaches are rare on San Francisco Bay, but strong tidal current to and from the Golden Gate tend to create them along the Berkeley and Albany shorelines. The beach has been heavily used by dog owners for decades.

Strong winds make the water south of the Bulb peninsula, off the beach, popular with wind- and kite- surfers. Eel grass near the Bulb tip is an important subtidal habitat. The sheltered lagoon at the west end is a calm-water refuge during storms, and shorebirds use its riprap edge at high tide.

Like other abandoned dumps, the Bulb became quickly vegetated. The vegetation is largely non-native, including weeds such as acacias, broom, and fennel; exotics such as palm and large thickets of Himalayan blackberries. 

The Bulb provides habitat for a variety of wildlife, including songbirds, rats, mice, black-tailed hares, as well as snakes, hawks and barn owls that feed on them.

The Plateau area, once popular for flying model airplanes, has been partly fenced off as a habitat for burrowing owls, as mitigation for habitat taken by sports fields to the south. As of 2016, a birder sighted and photographed at least one burrowing owl when dogs that are not permitted within the enclosed area entered it and flushed the bird out of the vegetation. The owl has since been spotted there again, but concerns about disturbance by dogs remain for this species that is quickly disappearing as a result of loss of habitat from development. 

The south shore's riprap is largely un-vegetated, but lagoons and some gentler shoreline on the north, facing the Albany Mudflats have welcomed typical salt-marsh vegetation such as pickleweed, salt grass, and gum plant.

Notable features 
Because the Bulb is geographically unorganized and because the Albany Police Department had for a long period of time been given orders to not enforce the law barring "camping", the Albany Bulb is often described as anarchic. Many groups, including urban artists, otherwise-homeless Albany residents, dog walkers and owners, teenagers, and environmentalists, used the Bulb area and felt they have a stake in it.

Art 

The Bulb was home to a vast array of urban art including mural, stencil, graffiti, sculpture, and installation art. In 2016, some art remains but it is quickly deteriorating and no where as vibrant as it was in its peak around 2006. Sculptor and activist lawyer Osha Neumann has created some of the largest works. He often collaborates with his son-in-law Jason DeAntonis. Sniff, a group of artists composed of Scott Hewitt, Scott Meadows and David Ryan, painted large, highly imaginative "murals" on wood and erected more sculptures on the northwest corner of The Bulb. Another Bulb landmark known as "Mad Marc's Castle," after its builder, a long-time Bulb resident, is a large concrete, rebar and plaster shelter which sits on the south west corner of the Bulb, directly opposite the Golden Gate Bridge. The Bulb has been used for informal concerts and even a production of Shakespeare's The Tempest presented by We Players, a Bay Area site-specific theatre company, in 2006.

Library 
The Bulb was home to a small, makeshift library, assembled mostly from driftwood and old boat pieces. The Landfill Library, comprised, on average, 300 volumes in various conditions, donated by its patrons. The books were free to borrow and keep, although a take-something-leave-something approach is encouraged.

As of August 2013, the library is closed due to vandals destroying it. On January 12, 2014 the library burned to the ground after a fire of unknown origin. With the resident squatters gone, it will most likely remain closed.

Homeless community 
Starting in the early 1990s, the Albany Bulb was home to a community of otherwise homeless individuals who lived there on and off for nearly 20 years, despite a lack of official permission from the City of Albany. Their presence was generally tolerated so long as the number of residents remained low.  The population living on the Bulb had grown to approximately 50 or 60 in early 1999, leading to a mass eviction by the city later that summer.  Homeless people began to filter back over the next few years, including many of those who had been evicted in 1999, and by early 2013, the population had again grown to more than 40. In May 2013 the Albany City Council voted to evict the residents of the Bulb, offering them minimal assistance with relocation to other living arrangements. Ultimately the city ended up offering 30 Bulb residents $3,000 each if they would leave their longtime homes on the Bulb in order to settle a lawsuit brought by the East Bay Community Law Center on behalf of the residents. 28 of the 30 plaintiffs accepted the buy-out and voluntarily left by April 24, 2014. Two Bulb residents, Amber Whitson and her partner Phyl Lewis, refused the settlement and the court dismissed their claims without prejudice. On May 29, 2014 at 4:00 am, Albany Police went out onto the Albany Bulb armed with assault rifles and arrested Amber Whitson and Phyl Lewis as well as one supporter, Erik Eisenberg, on charges alleging violation of California Penal Code 647(e) "lodging".

A documentary about the Albany Landfill Encampment, Bum's Paradise was released in 2003 documenting the 1999 eviction.

More recently, in 2013, Andy Kreamer (a former Bulb resident and aspiring history teacher) released a film called
Where Do YOU Go When It Rains? featuring Bulb residents talking candidly about their experiences living on the Albany Bulb.

In 2016, the Albany city council approved plans to create a city park out of the space. Although the agreement holds no legal weight, it sets the foundation for the city to approve budget funds for the park.  Further, the main trails were widened and leveled after the 2014 evictions to allow for greater motor vehicle access, police patrols were increased, and vegetation was cut back for several years to prevent further camping.

Development 
Environmental protections as well as understanding of the dangers of building on unconsolidated fill make it extremely unlikely that the Bulb could be developed. In 2006, Magna Corporation, owners of Golden Gate Fields race track, proposed a large commercial shopping area on the racetrack property southeast of the Bulb. Extensive protest led by Citizens for Eastshore Parks, headed by former Albany mayor Robert Cheasty, led to these plans being dropped. The future of the racetrack holdings remains uncertain.

Voices to Vision, a two-year study that examined what citizens of Albany desired for the waterfront, concluded in 2010.  Fern Tiger Associates who conducted the study reported that 62 percent of residents who participated in the study wanted to expand open space by at least 75 acres.  This expansion would mean 163 acres of parkland, trails, and wetlands at the waterfront.  The area would include the bulb, the Golden Gate Fields race track and parking lot, and the Eastshore State Park plateau.  However, the study also found that half of participants wanted enough development on the waterfront to maintain the current tax revenue generated from Golden Gate Fields, which is about $1.7 million.  85 percent of participants reported that building a hotel on the site would be a good idea, with many supporting additional retail and restaurant developments on the site.

References

External links
 Bum's Paradise IMDB page

Albany, California
Geography of Alameda County, California